Rock music in Angola has existed since the 1960s, with pioneering bands such as vum vum, Acromaníacos, Mutantes, Quinta-Feira, Ventos do Leste, Calhamback Band and Neblina.

Rock music in Angola is promoted through a radio program called Volume 10, that broadcasts every Saturday between 6:00 PM to 8:00 PM.

References

Music
Angola